= Alan Wellikoff =

American historian

Alan Wellikoff is a writer, historian, and the author/editor of several books on United States material history, travel, and practical advice, including The American Historical Supply Catalogue (1984), The American Historical Supply Catalogue 2 (1986), The Modern Man's Guide to Life (1987), The Historical Supply Catalogue (1993), and The Civil War Supply Catalogue (1996). From 2002 to 2005 he wrote a weekly automobile column for The New York Sun. An occasional guest on radio and television programs, he is a member of the Washington Automotive Press Association.
